Pool B of the 2019 Fed Cup Europe/Africa Zone Group II was one of two pools in the Europe/Africa zone of the 2019 Fed Cup. Four teams competed in a round robin competition, with the top team and the bottom team proceeding to their respective sections of the play-offs: the top team played for advancement to the Group I, while the bottom team faced potential relegation to Group III.

Standings 

Standings are determined by: 1. number of wins; 2. number of matches; 3. in two-team ties, head-to-head records; 4. in three-team ties, (a) percentage of sets won (head-to-head records if two teams remain tied), then (b) percentage of games won (head-to-head records if two teams remain tied), then (c) Fed Cup rankings.

Round-robin

Israel vs. Portugal

Luxembourg vs. South Africa

Israel vs. South Africa

Luxembourg vs. Portugal

Israel vs. Luxembourg

Portugal vs. South Africa

References

External links 
 Fed Cup website

2019 Fed Cup Europe/Africa Zone